Taraponui is a prominent peak in inland Hawke's Bay, in New Zealand's eastern North Island. It lies between the settlements of Te haroto and Tutira and rises to a height of 1352 meters. It is most noticed by a sharp drop on the west side and a large radio tower on top.

Hastings District
Mountains of the Hawke's Bay Region